American Stars 'n Bars is the eighth studio album by Canadian folk rock songwriter Neil Young, released on Reprise Records in 1977. Compiled from recording sessions scattered over a 29-month period, it includes "Like a Hurricane", one of Young's best-known songs. It peaked at #21 on the Billboard 200 and received a RIAA gold certification.

Background
Following the release of his album, Zuma, in November 1975, and a subsequent international spring tour with Crazy Horse, Young rekindled his partnership with Stephen Stills. Following the album Long May You Run. and a promotional tour that Young abandoned, he continued touring with Crazy Horse in the United States, then spent the first half of 1977 off the road. After recording several country rock compositions at sessions in April 1977, he assembled additional tracks from a variety of earlier recording dates to make up the second side of the new album.

The April 1977 sessions featured Crazy Horse augmented by an ad hoc grouping dubbed "The Bullets": pedal steel guitarist and longtime Young collaborator Ben Keith, violinist Carole Mayedo, and backing vocalists Linda Ronstadt and Nicolette Larson.

Content
"Homegrown" and "Star of Bethlehem" had initially been slated for his album Homegrown, which was shelved at the time. Both of those songs, along with "Like a Hurricane", "Hold Back the Tears", and "Will to Love", had also been slated for the unreleased Young album project, Chrome Dreams. Seven of the nine tracks feature his regular backing band Crazy Horse, and another, "Star of Bethlehem", features country music star Emmylou Harris. Songs from the April 1977 sessions are all in a country-styled vein, while the tracks from the second side are all in their original forms from their respective recording sessions (spanning 1974-1976).

The album cover was designed by actor and Young's close friend Dean Stockwell, who had also written the screenplay that inspired After the Gold Rush. It features Connie Moskos, then the girlfriend of producer David Briggs, drooping with a bottle of Canadian whisky in her hand and an intoxicated Young with his face pressed against the glass floor.

Reception

Initially receiving favorable reviews, the album was described as a "sampler...of Young's various styles", even a "hodgepodge." Paul Nelson, reviewing the album for Rolling Stone commented about the mixed selection of songs and styles, and praised the "gale-force guitar playing" of "Like a Hurricane": The album can almost be taken as a sampler, but not a summation, of Young's various styles from After the Gold Rush and Harvest (much of the country rock) through On the Beach (the incredible "Will to Love") to Zuma ("Like a Hurricane" is a worthy successor to "Cortez the Killer" as a guitar showcase)  with a lot of overlap within the songs. 

According to William Ruhlmann, in a review for Allmusic,Neil Young made a point of listing the recording dates of the songs on American Stars 'n Bars; the dates even appeared on the LP labels. They revealed that the songs had been cut at four different sessions dating back to 1974. But even without such documentation, it would have been easy to tell that the album was a stylistic hodgepodge, its first side consisting of country-tinged material featuring steel guitar and fiddle, plus backup vocals from Linda Ronstadt and then-unknown Nicolette Larson, while the four songs on the second side varied from acoustic solo numbers like "Will to Love" to raging rockers such as "Like a Hurricane." "Will to Love" is a particularly spooky and ambitious piece, extending the romantic metaphor of a salmon swimming upstream across seven minutes. The album's centerpiece however, is "Like a Hurricane," one of Young's classic hard rock songs and guitar workouts, and a perpetual concert favorite.

It was finally released on compact disc, as an HDCD, on August 19, 2003, as part of the Neil Young Digital Masterpiece Series along with On the Beach, Hawks & Doves, and Re-ac-tor.

Track listing
All songs written by Neil Young except as indicated.

Side one
Performed by Neil Young, Crazy Horse and the Bullets; recorded in April 1977.

Side two

Personnel
 Neil Young – vocals, guitars; harmonica ; glockenspiel, keyboard, piano, vibes, drums 
 Frank "Poncho" Sampedro – guitars ; synthesizer ; backing vocals 
 Ben Keith – pedal steel guitar ; Dobro, backing vocal 
 Carole Mayedo – violin 
 Billy Talbot – bass 
 Tim Drummond – bass 
 Ralph Molina – drums ; backing vocal 
 Karl T. Himmel – drums 
 Linda Ronstadt, Nicolette Larson – backing vocals 
 Emmylou Harris – harmony vocal

Charts 

Year End Album Charts

Certifications

References

External links 
  
 American Stars 'n Bars at Myspace (streamed copy where licensed)

Neil Young albums
1977 albums
Albums produced by David Briggs (producer)
Reprise Records albums
Albums produced by Elliot Mazer
Albums produced by Neil Young
Warner Records albums
Crazy Horse (band) albums
Albums recorded at Wally Heider Studios